"Moments to Remember" is a 1955 popular song about nostalgia recorded by Canadian quartet The Four Lads.  The song was originally written by Robert Allen and Al Stillman for Perry Como but was turned down by Como's management.

The Four Lads recording
The Four Lads recorded it in June 1955 for Columbia Records as the B side to the single "Dream On, My Love." Bernie Toorish of the Four Lads credited the enthusiastic endorsement of Cleveland radio DJ Bill Randle for increasing radio airtime play and popularizing the recording. It eventually reached number 2 on Billboard magazine's Top 100 hit list (an early version of the Hot 100), sold 4 million copies and became the group's first gold record.

Besides the voices of the male quartet, the song also contains two uncredited female parts. According to the Four Lads' Frank Busseri, the introductory verse, ("January through December/We'll have moments to remember"), as well as the repeat of the Bridge section in harmony, ("When summer turns to winter",) were sung by Lois Winters of the Ray Charles Singers and the poetic spoken words in mid-song: ("A drive-in movie/Where we'd go/And somehow never watched the show/") were recited by Pat Kirby who at that time was a singer on Steve Allen's television show Tonight!.

Other noted versions
Bing Crosby recorded the song on November 23, 1955, with Buddy Cole and His Orchestra. 
Louis Armstrong - a single release (1955).
Ronnie Hilton with orchestra conducted by Frank Cordell recorded "Moments to Remember" in London on December 13, 1955, and released it on HMV POP-154 (78 rpm record) and HMV 7M 358 (single).
The American vocal group Deep River Boys Featuring Harry Douglas with Pete Brown's orchestra recorded it in Oslo on August 30, 1956. It was released on the 78 rpm record HMV AL 6037. 
The song was recorded by both the Statler Brothers and the Vogues in 1969, inciting a minor cover remake battle against the Buddah Records version by the Smoke Ring.
The Norman Luboff Choir - On the album "Moments to Remember" - 1960
The musical Forever Plaid includes their cover of the song.

Popular culture
Sirius XM Satellite Radio formerly aired, from July 2006 through March 2009, a show on their '50s channel named after the song, and featured the song as part of its theme music.

References

Songs about nostalgia
1955 songs
The Four Lads songs
Songs with music by Robert Allen (composer)
List songs
Songs with lyrics by Al Stillman